The Zou is a river of south-western Benin. It drains into the Ouémé River. The river banks are inhabited in parts by the Mahi people near the Togo border.

See also
List of rivers of Benin

References

Rivers of Benin